Alena Aliaksandrauna Sobaleva, née Navahrodskaya (born 11 May 1993) is a Belarusian athlete specialising in the hammer throw. She competed at the 2015 World Championships in Beijing finishing tenth. In addition, she won the silver at the 2015 European U23 Championships.

Her personal best in the event is 72.86 metres set in Cheboksary in 2015.

Competition record

References

External links
 

Living people
Place of birth missing (living people)
1993 births
Belarusian female hammer throwers
World Athletics Championships athletes for Belarus
Athletes (track and field) at the 2016 Summer Olympics
Olympic athletes of Belarus